Chan Shih-chang (born 7 June 1986) is a Taiwanese professional golfer, who plays on the Asian Tour.

Amateur career
As an amateur, Chan won the 2004 Hong Kong Amateur Open and competed in the 2006 Asian Games, winning the bronze medal in the men's team event.

Professional career
Chan turned professional in 2008 and has competed on several tours in Asia; the Japan Golf Tour, the Asian Tour, the Asian Development Tour, the PGA Tour China and the OneAsia Tour. He has also competed on the European Tour. Chan has had much success on the Asian Development Tour where he has won six times, including three wins in 2014 when he finished second on the Order of Merit.

He won the Eternal Courtyard Open on the PGA Tour China in 2015. 

Chan's biggest win came at the 2016 King's Cup, an event co-sanctioned by the Asian Tour and the European Tour. Later in 2016 he won the Asia-Pacific Diamond Cup Golf in Japan, an event co-sanctioned by the Japan Golf Tour and the Asian Tour.

In November 2021, Chan won the Blue Canyon Phuket Championship on the Asian Tour, the first event to return on the tour since the COVID-19 shutdown. He won by one shot ahead of Sadom Kaewkanjana and Tom Kim.

A few months later, Chan won the Royal's Cup, winning again over Sadom Kaewkanjana as well as Sihwan Kim. In October 2022, Chan won the Mercuries Taiwan Masters after defeating Rashid Khan in a playoff.

Amateur wins
2004 Hong Kong Amateur Open

Professional wins (17)

European Tour wins (1)

1Co-sanctioned by the Asian Tour

Japan Golf Tour wins (1)

1Co-sanctioned by the Asian Tour

Asian Tour wins (5)

1Co-sanctioned by the European Tour
2Co-sanctioned by the Japan Golf Tour

Asian Tour playoff record (1–0)

PGA Tour China wins (1)

Asian Development Tour wins (6)

1Co-sanctioned by the Professional Golf of Malaysia Tour
2Co-sanctioned by the Taiwan PGA Tour

Other wins (6)
2010 Taifong Open (Chinese Taipei)
2011 Camry Invitational (China)
2012 Kaohsiung Open (Chinese Taipei)
2014 Meridigen Technology Cup (Chinese Taipei), TPGA Championship (Chinese Taipei), Ashou Cup (Chinese Taipei)

Results in World Golf Championships

"T" = Tied

Team appearances
Amateur
Eisenhower Trophy (representing Taiwan): 2006
Bonallack Trophy (representing Asia/Pacific): 2008

Professional
World Cup (representing Taiwan): 2016

See also
List of golfers with most Asian Tour wins

References

External links

Taiwanese male golfers
Asian Tour golfers
Asian Games bronze medalists for Chinese Taipei
Asian Games medalists in golf
Golfers at the 2006 Asian Games
Medalists at the 2006 Asian Games
People from Hsinchu
1986 births
Living people